The 21st Army Corps was an Army corps in the Imperial Russian Army. Their headquarters are in Kiev.

Composition
33rd Infantry Division
44th Infantry Division

Part of
3rd Army: 1914 - 1915
8th Army: 1915
2nd Army: 1915
5th Army: 1915 - 1916
12th Army: 1916 - 1917
4th Army: 1917

Commanders
1906-1909: Nikolai Ruzsky
1914-1915: Yakov Schkinsky
sept 1917: Nikolai Bredov

References 

Corps of the Russian Empire